The Tshogdu (Dzongkha: ཚོགས་འདུ་; Wylie: tshogs-'du; "(Bhutanese Grand National) Assembly") was the unicameral legislature of Bhutan until 31 July 2007. The legislature had a total of 150 members. Dasho Ugen Dorje was the last President of the Tshogdu, with Nima Tshering the Secretary-General. It was replaced by the bicameral Parliament of Bhutan.

Composition
The Tshogdu was originally composed of locally elected town representatives, religious representatives, and members nominated by the king, all of whom served a three-year term. At the time of its dissolution, there were 4 female and 146 male members.

|-
!style="background-color:#E9E9E9;text-align:left;vertical-align:top;" width=350|Appointment method
!style="background-color:#E9E9E9"|Seats
|-
| style="text-align:left;" |Members elected from village constituencies
|106
|-
| style="text-align:left;" |Royally appointed members
|10
|-
| style="text-align:left;" |Representatives of monk Body
|10
|-
| style="text-align:left;" |Government appointed members
|24
|-
|style="text-align:left;background-color:#E9E9E9"|Total
|width="30" style="text-align:right;background-color:#E9E9E9"|150
|}

See also
Parliament of Bhutan
National Assembly of Bhutan
National Council of Bhutan
Prime Minister of Bhutan
Government of Bhutan

External links
The National Assembly of Bhutan website
Information on the Tshogdu

Parliament of Bhutan
Bhutan